This is a list of singles which topped the Irish Singles Chart in 1971.

Note that prior to 1992, the Irish singles chart was compiled from trade shipments from the labels to record stores, rather than on consumer sales. The chart date moved from Friday to Saturday in late January, and then to Thursday in early August.

See also
1971 in music
Irish Singles Chart
List of artists who reached number one in Ireland

1971 in Irish music
1971 record charts
1971